Kyu Sakamoto CD & DVD The Best is a Japanese album with 13 songs performed by Kyu Sakamoto and recorded by Toshiba EMI. A DVD with a live performance by Kyu Sakamoto also follows with the CD.

Track listing
CD
 "Ue Wo Muite Aruko" 
 "Mustafa"  
 "Sutekina Taiminguﾞ"  
 "Ashita Ga Arusa"
 "Shiawase nara teo tatakou"
 "Namidakun Sayonara"  
 "Tomodachi"
 "Let's Kiss Jenka"  
 "Mai, Mai, Mai"  
 "Why"(Wakamono Tachi)
 "Soshite Omoide" (Good old memories)
 "Miagete goran yoru no hoshi wo"
 "Ano Hi No Yakusoku" (Duet With Yukiko Kasiwagi)

DVD
 Kyu-chan Ondo
 Ue Wo Muite Aruko (Sukiyaki)
 Soshite Omoide
 Ikite ite yokatta

2005 compilation albums
2005 video albums
2005 live albums
Live video albums
Kyu Sakamoto albums